is a Japanese voice actress and narrator. Some of her prominent roles are Saya Tokido in Little Busters!, Yuri Nakamura in Angel Beats!, Awaki Musujime in A Certain Magical Index, Lisanna Strauss in Fairy Tail and Sylphie Appleton in Argevollen.

Biography

Filmography

Anime

Video games

Dubbing roles
 Care Bears – Good friend bear
 X-Men: Evolution – Kitty

References

External links
 Official blog 
 Official agency profile 
 

Living people
Japanese video game actresses
Japanese voice actresses
Voice actresses from Tokyo
Year of birth missing (living people)